Ostrinia avarialis is a moth in the family Crambidae. It was described by Hans Georg Amsel in 1970 and is found in Afghanistan.

References

Moths described in 1970
Pyraustinae